Henry Whiting (1640–1694) was a Virginia physician, planter and military officer who served in the House of Burgesses representing Gloucester County, on the Governor's Council, and as the Treasurer of the Virginia Colony.

Early and family life
His father James Whiting had emigrated from Britain and settled in Gloucester County. 
He married the widow Aphia Wyatt Bushrod (1650–circa 1673) in 1670 and the following year brought suit based on her rights as Richard Bushrod's widow. They had sons Major Henry Whiting (1670–1723) and Col. Francis Whiting (b. 1673). After Aphia's death, Whiting remarried Elizabeth, who bore a daughter (Catherine) and survived him.

Career
Gloucester County voters elected Henry Whiting to the General Assembly (later known as the House of Burgesses) in 1682, and he soon caused consternation for advocating a temporary session of tobacco planting (fertilization then being rare and tobacco using many nutrients, hence repeated plantings in the same area led to stunted crops). Although he was temporarily stripped of his military and civil offices (as major of the local militia and justice of the peace), Whiting won re-election to the Assembly in 1684. He was appointed to the Council of State (otherwise known as the Governor's Council, essentially the upper house of the General Assembly) in 1691 and served until his death in 1694.

Legacy
His son Henry (Jr.) followed his career path as a planter and also won election as the Gloucester County sheriff. His daughter Catherine married John Washington (1692–1746), who had inherited  in Gloucester County from his maternal grandfather Augustine Warner (who had represented Gloucester County as a burgess and as speaker of the assembly), and built a home Highgate on the Piankatank River in Gloucester County. Their son (this man's grandson) Warner Washington (1722–1790) would become a friend of his cousin George Washington, move westward to Frederick County in 1770 and establish a farm Fairfield, as well as hold local offices in Gloucester and Frederick Counties.

References

1640 births
1694 deaths
Virginia colonial people
people from Gloucester County, Virginia
House of Burgesses members
American people of English descent